Smiley Guy Studios is a Canadian animation production company founded in 1998 by graduates of the Canadian Film Centre. It is one of the most prominent creators of adult animation in Canada, with shows like Odd Job Jack, The Dating Guy, Sons of Butcher and Corner Gas Animated, unlike most studios which focus primarily on shows targeting children's or family demographics. Smiley Guy also produces family content.

Smiley Guy Studios has created original work such as the television series, Odd Job Jack, The World of Bruce McCall, and Pillars of Freedom, while also working with clients on a variety of animated television, film and new media projects such as Turbo Dogs, Skatoony, The Dating Guy, Hotbox, Sons of Butcher and The Kids in the Hall: Death Comes to Town.

Along with Vida Spark Productions, it is a co-producer of Corner Gas Animated, a revival of the hit live action situation comedy Corner Gas. Its first episode, "Bone Dry", which aired on April 2, 2018, is currently the highest rated première ever for The Comedy Network.

References

Notes
 AWN
 Smiley Guy Studios To  iThentic

External links 
 

Canadian animation studios